Lidiia Iakovleva may refer to:
 Lidiia Iakovleva (ski jumper)
 Lidiia Iakovleva (gymnast)